Tylcus hartwegii is a species of beetle in the family Cerambycidae, the only species in the genus Tylcus.

References

Clytini